Baladarband Rural District is a rural district (dehestan) in the Central District of Kermanshah County, Kermanshah Province, Iran. At the 2006 census, its population was 17,483, in 3,870 families. The rural district has 58 villages.

References 

Rural Districts of Kermanshah Province
Kermanshah County